Diễn Châu is a rural district of Nghệ An province in the North Central Coast region of Vietnam. As of 2003 the district had a population of 286,171. The district covers an area of 307 km². The district capital lies at Diễn Châu.

References

Districts of Nghệ An province